Strawbridge may refer to:

Strawbridge (surname)
Strawbridge, Wisconsin, an unincorporated community in Wisconsin, United States
Strawbridge's (formerly Strawbridge & Clothier), United States store

See also
Strawbridge v. Curtiss, court case